OM4 may refer to:
Olympus OM-4 camera
Multi-mode optical fiber type OM4